SpaceX Dragon C108 is a Cargo Dragon space capsule built by SpaceX. It is the first Dragon capsule to be flown three times, having its third launch in 2019. C108 was first used on CRS-6, and then used again for the CRS-13 and CRS-18 missions. It was the first capsule to be used a third flight, marking a milestone in SpaceX's drive to reduce space launch costs through reusing hardware.

History 
C108 was built as the eighth production Dragon capsule. This new Dragon was launched on the CRS-6 mission to the International Space Station (ISS). It splashed down on May 21, 2015 and was successfully retrieved. To prepare for its second flight, it had its heatshield replaced while the hull, avionics, and Draco thrusters were refurbished. The refurbished Dragon was relaunched in December 15, 2017 for the CRS-13 mission. Following an almost month-long stay, C108 landed on January 13, 2018. After undergoing another refurbishment, C108 was launched again in July 2019 for the CRS-18 mission. It landed for the final time on August 27, 2019 and was retired.

Flights

References

External links 
 

Individual space vehicles
SpaceX Dragon